Tell Tweini, (also Tell Toueini) possibly the ancient town of Gibala, is a 12 hectare archaeological site located 1 kilometre east of the modern city of Jableh, Syria. It is situated within the coastal plain of Jableh, a short distance of two other main archaeological sites: Tell Sukas (5 km) and Tell Siyannu (6 km). As a tell, the site is the result of centuries of habitation on the same place, which resulted in a rising mound, as every new generation built their houses on top of the remains of older structures. The tell is sited about 1.7 kilometers from the coast but it appears that in the Bronze Age a sea incursion provided a harbor access to the sea.

History

Tell Tweini was at least inhabited from the end of the third millennium BCE until the Persian period. The town may have been ancient Gibala, a city mentioned in a treaty found at Ugarit (modern Ras Shamra) from the 13th century BCE.

Early Bronze Age
The Early Bronze Age IV Period – Level 10-9 (ca. 2400-2000 BCE).
The site seems to have been settled during the Early Bronze Age IV period when structures were built on top of the limestone plateau. A sequence of two main architectural levels (Level 10 and 9) includes mudbrick constructions.

Middle Bronze Age
The Middle Bronze Age Period – Level 8 (ca. 2000-1600 BCE). Two occupation phases (Level 8CD and Level 8AB) can be assigned to the first half of the second millennium BCE. The exposed structures demonstrate stone floors, beneath which tombs were installed, ranging from simple earth graves, to jar burials and chamber tombs. All burials were implemented within the confines of domestic structures, traditional for this period. A monumental collective tomb is considered as one of the most exceptional finds from this period. It contained the skeletons of 58 individuals, dated to the Middle Bronze Age IIB/C (ca. 1700 BCE), based on numerous grave goods such as well-preserved ceramic vessels, bronze pins, a cylinder seal and a figurine. A number of Cypriot ceramics – which were not only found in the tomb, but also in its fill layers – underline the mercantile relations between Cyprus and the Levant during this period.

Late Bronze Age
The Late Bronze Age – Level 7 (ca. 1600-1200 BCE). During the Late Bronze Age II period (14th and 13th century BCE), Tell
Tweini was integrated in the Ugaritic Kingdom as its southernmost harbour and is mentioned as Gibala for the first time in the treaty between Niqmepa, king of Ugarit and the Hittite king Muršili II. Several soundings illustrate a stratigraphy of two occupation levels for the Late Bronze Age: Level 7DE and Level 7BC and one destruction level; Level 7A. The oldest phase, Level 7DE (Late Bronze Age I), was only recognized within the deep sounding. Cypriote Base-Ring Ware I, White Slip I and Red Lustrous Wheelmade Ware were associated with partially excavated stone constructions within this level.The vast occupation of Level 7BC is exemplified by large sized buildings with stone pavements, occasionally constructed on different terraces. Similar features occurred at the end of the Late Bronze Age II at Ugarit. Besides local ware, this level produced a wide range of Cypriote and
Late Helladic ceramics. Noteworthy objects are a number of cylinder seals, a bronze ring with Hieroglyphic-Luwian inscription and a bifacial seal with an
inscription in Hieroglyphic-Luwian. The numerous imports found in the Late Bronze Age levels at Tell Tweini confirm the existence of an elaborate network of international relations and commercial activities. The material culture of the latest phase of the Late Bronze Age at Tweini (Level 7BC) equivalents that of Ugarit. Around 1200 BCE, presumably shortly before the destruction of Ugarit, some parts of the site of Tweini seem to have been damaged by fire.
The ceramic repertoire of this destruction layer comprises a great quantity of Mycenaean sherds dating to the Late Helladic IIIA:2 and Late Helladic IIIB
periods, as well as a small number of locally produced Mycenaean pottery of the Late Helladic IIIC Early 1 style. Within this destruction layer a significant new ceramological feature emerges, namely handmade and burnished cooking pots. This ware also appears in the superimposing Early Iron Age levels.

Iron Age
The Iron Age I – Level 6GH and 6EF (ca. 1200-930 BCE). The creation of new buildings, erected on the destruction debris (Level 7A)
of the Late Bronze Age settlement, evidences the earliest remnants of Iron Age I urbanisation at Tell Tweini (Level 6GH), datable to the 12th century BCE (ca. 1190-1150/25 BCE). At several locations, Late Bronze Age floors and walls were partially reused. These structures represent the so-called squatter occupations. The ceramological material displays a continuation of the local material into the Iron Age I without the common imported Late Bronze Age wares from Cyprus or the Aegean world. The handmade and burnished cooking ware remains in use. Characteristic for Level 6GH is a red fabric covered in white slip and red paint. 
The second architectural phase attested for the Early Iron Age at Tell Tweini and labelled Level 6EF can be found in clusters on Field A. The clear in situ
contexts with similar material evidence point to a revival of the site before catapulting into the more monumental Iron Age II period during the 9th century BCE. A number of rooms and structures were probably reused from the underlying 6GH level, complemented with newly constructed buildings with an
extension similar to the Late Bronze Age settlement. The foundation of a larger rectangular edifice, with several room annexes to the south, was exposed in
Field A. This building is interpreted as the initial construction phase of the later monumental Building A. A conflagration caused the final occupation phase of level 6EF to be well preserved with several in situ inventories.

Iron Age II – Level 6CD-6AB (ca. 930-750 BCE). By the beginning of the 9th century BCE Tell Tweini had been completely redeveloped. Excavations and a geomagnetic survey revealed a well-preserved plan of the city during the Iron II/III period (ca. 900-500 BCE), showing a new orientation of the city structure, with an elaborate street system connecting several monumental buildings, including a Phoenician temple district, with domestic
and industrial areas. During the second half of the 9th century BCE (Level 6AB) the urban lay-out of Tell Tweini slightly altered. Official buildings were reused and extended and new residential houses were erected. Numerous imports of Cypriot pottery at Tweini reflect the expanding economic and commercial network between Cyprus, Phoenicia and inner Syria.

Iron Age III – Level 5 and 4 (750-333 BCE). By the end of the 8th century BCE, an architectural reorganization occurred at the centre of Tell Tweini.  Production of olive oil and wine became the major economic activity of the town; many buildings were equipped with oil presses and refining installations. The public buildings in Field A lost their initial function and were divided into small chambers used as workshops.
From the Hellenistic Period onward the settlement moves towards the coast and the tell is abandoned. Only scattered sherds, remains of tombs and some
installations found in Field A and B, albeit on a very limited scale, refer to the Hellenistic, Roman and Byzantine periods.

Archaeology
The site consists of a tell, 350 meters by 290 meters, with a height 15-20 meters above the surrounding plain.

Beginning in 1999, Tell Tweini was investigated by a Syro-Belgian interdisciplinary team led by Michel al-Maqdissi, Joachim Bretschneider and Karel Van Lerberghe.

The Syrian team worked in Field B while the Belgian team worked in Fields A and C.
Major discoveries include a Phoenician sanctuary, a large communal tomb from the end of the Middle Bronze Age containing 58 human remains, a large city wall, several domestic and public structures from the Iron Age I-II and multiple small finds. Excavations ended in 2010, interrupted by of local condition but work on the findings continue. Finds from the Middle Bronze II period included cylinder seals, stamp seals, and clay sealings.

See also
Short chronology timeline - one of the chronologies of the Near Eastern Bronze and Early Iron Age
Cities of the ancient Near East

Notes

References
Bretschneider J. and Jans G.(eds.) 2019: About Tell Tweini (Syria): Artefacts, Ecofacts and Landscape. Research Results of the Belgian Mission (Orientalia Lovaniensia Analecta Series 281).
Al-Maqdissi M., Badawy M., Bretschneider J., Hameeuw H., Jans G., Vansteenhuyse K., Voet G. and Van Lerberghe K. 2008: The Occupation Levels of Tell Tweini and their Historical Implications, in: Biggs R., Myers J. and Roth M. (eds.), Proceedings of the 51st Rencontre Assyriologique Internationale, Chicago, p. 341-350.
Kaniewski D., E. Paulissen, E. Van Campo, H. Weiss, T. Otto, J. Bretschneider and K. Van Lerberghe 2010: Late Second-Early First Millennium BC Abrupt Climate Changes in Coastal Syria and their Possible Significance for the History of the Eastern Mediterranean, Quaternary Research 74, 207-215.
Kaniewski D., Marriner N., Bretschneider J., Jans G., Morhange Ch., Cheddadi R., Otto Th., Luce F., Van Campo E. 2019: 300-year drought frames Late Bronze Age to Early Iron Age transition in the Near East: New palaeoecological data from Cyprus and Syria, in: Regional Environmental Change.  19(8). p.2287-2297 
Jung R. 2018: Mycenaen Pottery in Coastal Syria, in: Badre L. et al. (eds.), Tell Kazel au Bronze Récent. Études Céramiques, Beyrouth, p. 47-51.
Marinova, Elena, et al. "An experimental approach for tracing olive processing residues in the archaeobotanical record, with preliminary examples from Tell Tweini, Syria." Vegetation history and archaeobotany 20.5 (2011): 471-478.

External links

 Syro-Belgian Tell Tweini excavation project
 Geophysical prospection results from the 2004 campaign

Neolithic sites in Syria
Former populated places in Syria
Iron Age sites in Syria
Archaeological sites in Latakia Governorate